Penelope 'Pim' Allison academic archaeologist specialising the Roman Empire and since 2015 has been professor of archaeology at the University of Leicester. She is also a Fellow of the Society of Antiquaries and an Honorary Fellow of the Australian Academy of the Humanities.

Life 
Allison is originally from North Canterbury in New Zealand. She grew up on a sheep farm.

Career 
Allison received an undergraduate degree in pure mathematics from the University of Canterbury, and her MA Honours and her doctorate in archaeology from the University of Sydney. She was a scholar at the British School in Rome, and has taught archaeology and ancient history at the University of Sydney, the Australian National University and the University of Sheffield. She has held several research fellowships, including a fellowship in the Classics faculty at the University of Cambridge and fellowships at the University of Sydney. She joined the School of Archaeology and Ancient History at the University of Leicester as a lecturer in 2006.

She specialises in Roman and historical archaeology and has particular interests in household archaeology, and gender and space. Many of her publications relate to houses and households in Pompeii, and gender and space in Roman military forts in Germany. She is also interested in digital archaeology and how archaeological data can be spread digitally.

Honors and awards 
Allison is a senior fellow of the Higher Education Academy, a fellow of the Society of Antiquaries of London, an honorary fellow of the Australian Academy of the Humanities and a corresponding member of the Archaeological Institute of America.

Research 
Allison's research focuses on household archaeology as well as gender and space. Her current interests have expanded to encompass households and their activities in the colonial outback in Australia and foodways material culture in the Roman and colonial worlds. She also has an interest in digital archaeology and the digital dissemination of archaeological data. This last interest can be seen in her numerous open access publications and data, including Engendering Roman Military Spaces and an online companion to Pompeian households (which includes detailed documentary information on 30 Pompeian houses and their contents, consisting of 865 rooms and more than 16,000 artifacts).

She has been involved in several projects: Big Data on the Roman Table (a research network), the Kinchega Archaeological Research Project, the Libarna Household Archaeology Project, People and Spaces in Roman Military Bases, and Pompeian Houses and Households.

Publications

Books 
 Who came to Tea at the Old Kinchega Homestead?: Tablewares, Teawares and Social Interaction at an Australian Outback Pastoral Homestead (Leicester: BAR Publishing, 2020)
  Big Data on the Roman Table: New approaches to tablewares in the Roman world, co-editor, (Internet Archeology, 2018)
 People and Space in Roman Military Bases (Cambridge University Press, 2013)
 The Insula of the Menander in Pompeii III: The finds, a contextual study (Oxford: Clarendon Press, 2006)
 Pompeian households: analysis of the material culture, Monograph 42 (Los Angeles: Cotsen Institute of Archaeology, UCLA, 2004)

Edited books 
 (co-editor) Big Data on the Roman Table, New approaches to tablewares in the Roman world, Internet Archaeology vol. 50 (2018) 
Dealing with legacy data, themed volume of Internet Archaeology 24-25 (2008)
 The Archaeology of Household Activities (Routledge: London and New York, 1999)

Other publications 
 Roman household organization, in S. Crawford, D. M. Hadley and G. Shepherd, eds. The Oxford Handbook of the Archaeology of Childhood, 165–178. Oxford: Oxford University Press (2018) 
 Meals and the Roman military, in T. Ivleva, J. de Bruin, M. Driessen (eds), Embracing the Provinces: Society and Material Culture of the Roman Frontier Regions. Essays in honour of Dr.  Carol van Driel Murray. Oxford: Oxbow Books (2018)
 "Naming tablewares: using the artefactual evidence to investigate eating and drinking practices across the Roman world", in E. Minchin and H. Jackson  (eds) Festschrift for Graeme Clarke, SIMA - Studies in Mediterranean Archaeology, 186–198. Uppsala: Astrom editions (2017)
 "Everyday foodways and social connections in Pompeian houses", in L. Steel and K. Zinn, eds, Exploring the materiality of food “stuffs”: Transformations, symbolic consumption and embodiments, 152–186. London and New York: Routledge (Taylor and Francis, 2016).
 "Characterising Roman artefacts for investigating gendered practices in contexts without sexed bodies", American Journal of Archaeology 119.1 (2015)
 "Artefacts and people on the Roman frontier", in D. J. Breeze, R.H. Jones, and I. A. Oltean, eds, Understanding Roman frontiers: A celebration for Professor Bill Hanson, 121–134. Edinburgh: John MacDonald (2015).
 "Conversations and material memories: insights into outback domestic life at the Old Kinchega Homestead", Historical Archaeology 48.1 (2014): 87–104.
 "Soldiers' families in the early Roman Empire", in B. Rawson, ed., Families in the Greek and Roman worlds: a companion, 161–182. Oxford: Wiley-Blackwell (2011)
 "Understanding Pompeian household practices through their material culture", FACTA: A Journal of Roman material culture studies 3 (2009): 11-32
 "Mapping for gender: interpreting artefact distribution in Roman military forts in Germany", Archaeological Dialogues 13.1 (2006): 1-48
 "Pompeian households", on-line companion to Monograph 42, Cotsen Institute of Archaeology, UCLA (The Stoa: A Consortium for Electronic Publication in the Humanities).
 "Artefact distribution and spatial function in Pompeian houses", in B. Rawson and P. Weaver, eds, The Roman family in Italy: status, sentiment and space, 321-354 (Clarendon Press, Oxford, 1997)
 "Roman households: an archaeological perspective", in H. Parkins, ed., Roman urbanism: beyond the consumer city, 112-146 (Routledge, London and New York, 1997)
 "Why do excavation reports have finds' catalogues?", in C. G. Cumberpatch and P.W. Blinkhorn, eds, Not so much a pot, more a way of life, 77- 84 (Oxbow Books, Oxford, 1997)
 "On-going seismic activity and its effect on living conditions in Pompeii in the last decades", in T. Fröhlich and L. Jacobelli, eds, Archäologie und Seismologie: La regione vesuviana dal 62 al 79 d.C.: problemi archeologici e sismologici (Deutsches Archäologisches Institut Rom, Soprintendenza Archeologica di Pompei, Osservatorio Vesuviano), 183-190 (Biering and Brinkman, Munich, 1995)

References

External links 
 Penelope Allison on Worldcat
Penelope Allison at the University of Leicester

Living people
Year of birth missing (living people)
Academics of the University of Leicester
People from North Canterbury
University of Canterbury alumni
University of Sydney alumni
New Zealand archaeologists
Fellows of the Australian Academy of the Humanities
Fellows of the Society of Antiquaries of London
New Zealand classical scholars
Women classical scholars
New Zealand women archaeologists